La Cassa is a comune (municipality) in the Metropolitan City of Turin in the Italian region Piedmont, located about  northwest of Turin. 
 
La Cassa borders the following municipalities: Fiano, Varisella, Druento, Givoletto and San Gillio.

References

External links
 Official website

Cities and towns in Piedmont